Lac Lyster is a lake located in the municipality of Coaticook (Baldwin Mills), in the Coaticook Regional County Municipality (MRC), in the administrative region of Estrie, in Québec, in Canada.

Geography 

The lake is located to the south of the territory of the city of Coaticook, very close to the American border. The hamlet of Baldwin Mill is located on the north shore, Mount Pinacle to the east, and Mount Barnston to the west.

See also 
 Tomifobia River

References

External links 
 Map of Lyster Lake

Lakes of Estrie
Coaticook Regional County Municipality